Väddö is an island in the Baltic Sea in Roslagen district, Sweden. It is situated in Norrtälje Municipality. Together with the adjoined Björkö it is considered the seventh largest island of Sweden.

Väddö is separated from the mainland by the artificial Väddö Canal, first dug in the 16th century.

See also 
 Geography of Sweden
 Islands of Sweden

Islands of Norrtälje Municipality
Islands of the Stockholm archipelago